Dual specificity phosphatase 13 is an enzyme that in humans is encoded by the DUSP13  gene.

Function 

Members of the protein tyrosine phosphatase superfamily cooperate with protein kinases to regulate cell proliferation and  differentiation. This superfamily is separated into two families based on the substrate that is dephosphorylated. One family, the dual specificity phosphatases (DSPs) acts on both phosphotyrosine and phosphoserine/threonine residues. This gene encodes different but related DSP proteins through the use of non-overlapping open reading frames, alternate splicing, and presumed different transcription promoters. Expression of the distinct proteins from this gene has been found to be tissue specific and the proteins may be involved in postnatal development of specific tissues. A protein encoded by the upstream ORF was found in skeletal muscle, whereas the encoded protein from the downstream ORF was found only in testis. In mouse, a similar pattern of expression was found. Multiple alternatively spliced transcript variants were described, but the full-length sequence of only some were determined.

References

Further reading

EC 3.1.3